Dalcerides is a genus of moths of the family Dalceridae. It was described by Berthold Neumoegen and Harrison Gray Dyar Jr. in 1893.

Species
Dalcerides flavetta group:
Dalcerides flavetta (Schaus, 1905)
Dalcerides rebella (Schaus, 1911)
Dalcerides chirma (Schaus, 1920)
Dalcerides radians (Hopp, 1921)
Dalcerides dulciola (Dyar, 1914)
Dalcerides mesoa (Druce, 1887)
Dalcerides nana (Dognin, 1920)
Dalcerides sofia (Dyar, 1910)
Dalcerides ingenita group:
Dalcerides ingenita Edwards, 1882
Dalcerides bicolor Schaus, 1910
Dalcerides alba (Druce, 1887)

References

Dalceridae
Zygaenoidea genera